Məmmədli (also, Falmay-Mahomedly, Magamedly, Magomedli, Magomedly, Mamedi, and Mamedli) is a village and municipality in the Absheron Rayon of Azerbaijan.  It has a population of 2,758.

References 

Populated places in Absheron District